Natsuki Mizu (水夏希 Mizu Natsuki, born 1972) is the former top star (otokoyaku) for Snow Troupe of Takarazuka Revue from December 24, 2006 to September 12, 2010. She joined the company in 1993 and became the top star in December 2006 upon the resignation of Hikaru Asami.

She is from Chiba-shi, Chiba-ken and her birthday is August 16.

Her nickname is Mizu and Chika.

Troupe history 
 Moon Troupe: 1993–1997
 Flower Troupe: 1997–2001
 Cosmo Troupe: 2000–2005
  Snow Troupe: 2005–2010

General information 
Starting her career in the Moon Troupe, she is one of a few current younger and non-Senka members (and also in the roster) that have participated in the performances with all 5 troupes (even it is just a special appearance for Star production of Rose of Versailles). She is one of several promising young stars that were promoted in 1999 (along with Sumire Haruno, the former top star for Flower Troupe and Hikaru Asami, the former top star for Snow Troupe). Before she was promoted to top star, she was considered as one of top-stars-in-waiting along with Kei Takashiro, the former top star for Cosmo Troupe, Kei Aran, the current top star for Star Troupe, Jun Sena, the current top star for Moon Troupe, and Yūga Yamato, the current top star of Cosmo Troupe.

While she was in Moon Troupe, she had already caught the attention, took the title role of Me and My Girl of the first half of the New Actor Production in 1995. In 1996, she was in title role of CAN-CAN. Then she transferred to the Flower Troupe.

Her time in the Flower Troupe is when she most notably developed her skills. Together with Sumire Haruno (class of 1991) and Jun Sena (class of 1992), they formed a tight trio among the younger performers in the Flower Troupe. During those years, she got praises for her performance on the leading role of Yoake no Jokyoku: her first leading role for New Actor production in Flower Troupe. Also she had her first leading show, Romeo and Juliet '99 at the Bow Hall (with Kanami Ayano, retired Top musumeyaku star) in 1999.

After participating the oversea performance at Berlin, Germany in 2000, she was transferred to Cosmo Troupe. With the establishment of the New Senka (In June 2000, the directors of the company had made a radical change on the troupe structure by sending the second and third tier actresses of each troupe to the Senka, which served as the waiting list for top star of the troupes.), she became the second man for Yoka Wao from 2002 to 2005. In her Cosmo years, she had memorable performance as both Oscar and Andre in Rose of Versailles, Robert in Pierre the Mercenary and villainous Count Edmond de Lambrouse in Lightning in the Daytime.

Marking the 90th anniverisery for the company, she had a special appearance for Snow production of Susano-o, where she was the antagonist Aosetona in 2004. Another noteworthy performance was her villainous role as Count Edmond. She also has a special appearance as Benito in Flower's La Esperanza with Hiromu Kiriya from Moon Troupe in the same year.

After performing Hotel Stella Maris for Cosmo Troupe in both Takarazuka Grand Theater and Tokyo Takarazuka Theater, she was suddenly transferred to Snow Troupe. With Kei Takashiro's promotion to top star for Cosmo Troupe, she became the second man for Hikaru Asami. In December 2006, she was finally promoted to be top star.

In 2004, she did the role of Tzeitel in the Japanese production of Fiddler on the Roof.

Her Grand Theater debut is Elisabeth in May 2007. This makes her the second top star to perform this favourite musical of Takarazuka as her debut as a top star.

She was the leading member of the now defunct AQUA5, along with fellow troupe mates Mao Ayabuki, Kei Otozuki, Oto Ayana and Kaname Ouki. They had performed at the opening ceremony of 2007 World Championships in Athletics.

She has a twin sister, Yoko Masuda, who is an acupuncturist for Cirque Du Soleil.

Notable performance and role

Moon New Actor era 

Me and My Girl - Bill (leading role shared with Kouki Naruse)
CAN-CAN - Aristide Forestier (leading role)

Flower era 

Yoake no Jokyoku - Kawakami Otojirou (leading role in New Actor performance, her role in the formal performance is George)
Asaki Yume Mishi - Genji Monogatari - Akashi No Onkata (female role)
 Romeo and Juliet '99 - Romeo (First leading performance at Takarazuka Bow Hall)

Cosmo era 

Rose of Versailles: Fersen and Marie Antoinette - Oscar François de Jarjayes
Figaro! - Figaro / Antonio  (Bow Hall performance)
Calaf & Turandot - Barak
Castel Mirage - Joe
Pierre the Mercenary - Robert
Legend of the Eight Dog Samurai - Inue Shinbei (Bow Hall performance)
Lightning in the Daytime - Count Edmond de Lambrouse
Romance de Paris - Rachid Salam (Special appearance for Snow Troupe, replacing Sakiho Juri at Nissan Theater)
Susano-o - Aosetona (Special appearance for Snow Troupe)
La Esperanza - Benito (Special appearance for Flower Troupe)
Hotel Stella Maris - Allen Kendall

Snow era 

Milan Wrapped in Fog - Giambattista Salvatore
Silver Wolf - Ray
Rose of Versailles: Fersen and Marie Antoinette - Oscar François de Jarjayes (Special Appearance for Star Troupe, shared with Hiromu Kiriya, Yūhi Ōzora, Kei Takashiro and Hikaru Asami)
Rose of Versailles: Oscar - Andre (shared with Wataru Kozuki, Sumire Haruno, Kei Aran, Jun Sena and Kei Takashiro)/Alain de Soissons/Oscar François de Jarjayes  (National Tour)
Lucifer's Tears - Jean-Paul Doret

Snow Top Star era 

Hoshikage no Hito - Souji Okita (Top Star debut)
Elisabeth - Der Tod (Top Star debut at Grand Theatre)
I love you －Je t'aime/Miroirs - George de Charette
Side Story: The Rose of Versailles - Girodel/Miroirs - Victor-Clement de Girodelle
Soromon no Yubiwa / Maripoosa no Hana - Nero
Karamaazofu no Kyoudai - Dmitri "Mitya" Fyodorovich Karamazov
Nishiki-e of the Wind / Zorro - The Masked Messiah - Don Diego de la Vega/ Zorro
Russian Blue -Malleus Maleficarum- / Rio de Bravo!! - Albert Whistler
Passionate Barcelona / Rio de Bravo!! - (National Tour) Marquis Francisco Laforet
Daybreak at Solferino / Carnavale, A Sleeping Dream - Henri Dunant
Roget / Rock On! - Roget Jardin

A Note for Oscar 

Rose of Versailles plays an important part for her Takarazuka career: because she is the very few that has been in both role of Oscar and Andre. The following list is her partners when she was in either role:

As Oscar 

Nao Ayaki as Andre in the 2001 Cosmo production
Yoka Wao as Hans Axel Von Fersen in the same production as Ayaki
Wataru Kozuki as Hans Axel Von Fersen in the 2006 Star production
Kei Aran as Andre in the same production as Kozuki
Kazuho Sou as Andre in the Snow National Tour

As Andre 

Nao Ayaki as Oscar in the 2001 Cosmo production
Hikaru Asami as Oscar in 2006 Snow Production

References

1972 births
Living people
Japanese stage actresses
Takarazuka Revue
People from Chiba (city)